Thomas Aquinas Daly (born March 27, 1937) is an American contemporary landscape and still life painter.

Educated as a graphic artist at the University at Buffalo, Daly spent 23 years working in the commercial printing business before leaving it in 1981 to devote his full attention to painting. Since then, his work has been displayed in numerous solo exhibitions at galleries, museums and universities throughout the country. President Gerald R. Ford recognized Daly's talent by awarding him Grand Central Art Galleries' Gold Medal at the opening of his 1987 show in New York. In addition to painting, Daly has produced two books: Painting Nature's Quiet Places (Watson-Guptill, 1985) and The Art of Thomas Aquinas Daly: The Painting Season (1998).

His paintings have also appeared in several other publications, among them: The Ultimate Fishing Book, The Sweet of the Year, The Sporting Life, Atlantic Salmon Chronicles and The Art of Shooting Flying. Additionally his work has been featured in periodicals such as Gray's Sporting Journal, Arts Magazine, American Artist, Sports Afield, Sporting Classics, Wildlife Art News, Southwest Art, and Watercolor.

Sources 

 Daly, Thomas Aquinas; Daly, Christine A. (1998). The Art of Thomas Aquinas Daly: The Painting Season. Arcade: T.A. Daly Studio. .
 Daly, Thomas Aquinas (1985). Painting Nature's Quiet Places. New York: Watson-Guptill Publications.

External links
 
National Museum of Wildlife Art
 

1937 births
20th-century American painters
American male painters
21st-century American painters
Living people
University at Buffalo alumni
Place of birth missing (living people)
20th-century American male artists